Sreekanth Addala is an Indian film director and screenwriter who works in Telugu cinema. After working as an assistant director for several films, Addala made his directorial debut in 2008 with Kotha Bangaru Lokam. He went onto write and direct films such as Seethamma Vakitlo Sirimalle Chettu (2013), Mukunda (2014), Brahmotsavam (2016), and  Narappa (2021).

Career
Addala began his career in film industry as an assistant director. While working for the film Arya (2004), he was associated with producer Dil Raju. Raju was impressed with Addala and gave him an advance of 9000 to come up with a story. After working as an assistant for the film Bommarillu (2006), he worked for six months and came up with the script for Kotha Bangaru Lokam. The film, featuring Varun Sandesh and Shweta Prasad, was released in 2008. The film was commercially successful and won multiple Nandi Awards and Filmfare Awards in various categories. After nearly two years, Addala began working on Seethamma Vakitlo Sirimalle Chettu with Venkatesh and Mahesh Babu. Produced by Raju, the film was released on 11 January 2013 to positive reviews. He later directed films like Mukunda, Brahmotsavam (2016), and Narappa (2021).

Filmography

As writer and director

As lyricist 

As actor
Arya (2004)

References

External links
 

Telugu film directors
Living people
21st-century Indian film directors
Year of birth missing (living people)
Place of birth missing (living people)
Film directors from Andhra Pradesh
People from West Godavari district